Latrodectus indistinctus is a species of spider in the family Theridiidae, found in Namibia and South Africa. It is one of six species of Latrodectus found in southern Africa, four of which, including L. indistinctus, are known as black button or black widow spiders. Like all Latrodectus species, L. indistinctus has a neurotoxic venom. It acts on nerve endings, causing the very unpleasant symptoms of latrodectism when humans are bitten.

Description and behavior 
Like all spiders in the genus Latrodectus, females are larger than males.  Females range from 7 to 16 mm, and the males 2.5 to 5 mm.  In maturity, most retain at least short red stripes radiating upward from the tip of the dorsal abdomen.

Like many black widows, it is not aggressive. Its defense method when it feels threatened is to drop to the ground and play dead. Their egg sacks are usually hung in bush vegetation, where prey, which includes insects and arthropods, is available nearby.  Females will occasionally attack to defend their eggs.

Habitat 
Its distribution is limited in Namibia and South Africa, Found in habitats such as tangled bushes, uncut grass, tall vegetation in dry places, agricultural areas and forests.

Venom 
They have neurotoxins known as latrotoxins. Within 15 minutes after a bite there is intense pain, burning sensation, and swelling. Systemic effects, such as intense muscle pain and cramps, can occur hour later. Other symptoms include anxiety, slurred speech, feeling sick, headaches, sweating, and fever. Rapid pulse, increased blood pressure, and tightness in the chest together with difficulty breathing are important symptoms, which are usually more dangerous for children and elderly people with cardiovascular and respiratory diseases. 

In a case that occurred in 2016, in South Africa, in a 38-year-old man reported symptoms such as intense muscle pain, erythema, stiffness at the location of the bite that radiated to the trunk, arm and neck, muscle spasms, and mild tachycardia.

References

indistinctus
Spiders described in 1904
Invertebrates of Namibia
Spiders of Africa